Bekaraoka is a rural municipality in Madagascar. It belongs to the district of Vangaindrano, which is a part of Atsimo-Atsinanana Region. The population of the commune was estimated to be approximately 3,000 in 2001 commune census.

Only primary schooling is available. The majority 98% of the population of the commune are farmers.  The most important crops are rice and cloves, while other important agricultural products are coffee and cassava. Services provide employment for 2% of the population.

Geography
Bekaraoka is situated South-West of Farafangana and in the North-West of Vangaindrano. The next National road (RN 12) is in a distance of 16 km . The dirt road to Bekaraoka can be passed by vehicules only in the dry season.

References 

Populated places in Atsimo-Atsinanana